Vietnam Airlines Flight 850 was an international scheduled passenger flight from Bangkok to Ho Chi Minh City. On 4 September 1992, the Airbus A310-222 serving the flight was hijacked by Ly Tong, a former pilot in the Republic of Vietnam Air Force. He then dropped anti-communist leaflets over Ho Chi Minh City before parachuting out. Vietnamese security forces later arrested him on the ground. The aircraft landed safely, and no one on board was injured. He was released from a Hanoi prison in 1998.

Aircraft
The hijacked plane, Airbus A310-222, chartered by Vietnam Airlines from Jes Air (Bulgaria), operating as VN 850, registered LZ-JXB, serial number 419, put into service in 1986 by CAAC Airlines and later in 1988 by China Eastern Airlines with registration B-2303. The aircraft was later sold to Jes Air in 1991. The aircraft was powered by Pratt & Whitney JT9D-7R4E1.

Hijacking
At 17:00 September 4, 1992, the flight took off from Don Mueang International Airport in Bangkok en-route to Tan Son Nhat International Airport in Ho Chi Minh City.

When the aircraft was about 80 miles from Ho Chi Minh City, Ly Tong, a retired South Vietnamese fighter pilot and naturalized U.S. citizen, used a plastic knife and a clothes hanger to threaten members of the crew. Tong claimed that he had an explosive device and had a flight attendant take him to the cockpit. Tong then forced the pilot to lower the aircraft's altitude to 500 feet, reduce speed to a minimum, and enter the restricted airspace over the city.

For the next thirty minutes, Tong threw sacks of leaflets out of the cockpit window calling for an insurrection against the communist government of Vietnam in order to "build an independent, free and prosperous Vietnam." Signing himself "Commander of the Uprising Forces," Tong subsequently donned a parachute and jumped out of an emergency exit.

No one on board the plane was injured and the plane was able to continue its flight, landing safely at Tan Son Nhat International Airport  with a 38-minute delay.

Aftermath

Tong reportedly was captured by Vietnamese soldiers in a field outside of Ho Chi Minh City two hours later. A Vietnam Airlines spokesman said that the plane was slightly damaged when a door opened "for technical reasons" in flight between Bangkok and Ho Chi Minh City but denied that a hijacking had taken place. Hanoi's Voice of Vietnam radio network later admitted that a hijacking had taken place. 

On February 24, 1993, the Supreme People's Court of Ho Chi Minh City charged Tong with air piracy and sentenced him to 20 years in prison. On September 2, 1998, Vietnamese President Trần Đức Lương signed a decision to pardon and deport Ly Tong to the US. After being pardoned, Tong continued to carry out plane hijacking missions to spread leaflets calling for the overthrow of the Cuban, Chinese and North Korean governments.

According to the inspection documents of Vietnam Airlines, Tong's act caused USD 500,000 and VND 7,000,000 damages to the company.

After the incident, the aircraft was re-registered as B-2303 and was sold to China Northwest Airlines in 1993. The aircraft was transferred to China Eastern Airlines in 2003 after the merger with China Northwest Airlines and was stored until 2006. In 2006, the aircraft was passed onto Burmese airline Air Bagan as XY-AGD and was stored till 2011 and on the same year, the aircraft's ownership was taken over by Singaporean aircraft lessor Phoenix Aircraft Leasing who sold the aircraft to Thai charter airline P.C. Air as HS-PCC, where it was its sole operating aircraft until 2012 when the airline went bankrupt. The aircraft was stored and later broken up in 2020 at Don Mueang International Airport. The airframe is now preserved as an instructional airframe at Rajamangala University of Technology Thanyaburi, where it serves as a training aid for students in the university's aviation engineering department.

References

Aircraft hijackings
Accidents and incidents involving the Airbus A310
1992 in Vietnam
Aviation accidents and incidents in Vietnam
Vietnam Airlines accidents and incidents